Anak Jalanan (English: Street Kids) is an Indonesian soap opera musical comedy drama produced by SinemArt that aired daily on RCTI.

Plot
Boy is a sloppy and indifferent teenager who is also pious and handsome. He sports a cool and dashing style when riding a motorcycle and he often wins races, making girls around him swoon. Boy is the leader of the Warriors motorcycle gang. His friendly attitude, general indifference, combined with intelligence and athleticism, make him the center of attention.

Boy ignores the attention he gets from the girls around him, however. In his heart, there is only one woman: Adriana, his ex-girlfriend, whom he loved deeply, but who left him for an older and wealthier man. Boy still feels wounded by her betrayal.

One day, Boy meets Reva, a girl he helps after getting involved in a chase with a rival motorcycle gang. Boy is initially surprised to find that the motorcyclist he was helping is a beautiful girl. The skill with which she handles her motorcycle leaves him feeling impressed. After the chase, Riva is upset at Boy as his behaviour has led to a dispute between the two gangs. The rival gang, led by Mondy, thinks Reva is a member of the Warriors. Boy feels guilty about this, and plans to dissolve the Warriors. His friends oppose this and try to take the gang's leadership away from him. The Warriors gang begins to split up.

Reva is the daughter of a wealthy businessman, Bey, and she races motorcycles as a form of rebellion against the fact that her father has married a girl no older than she is herself. Reva also believes her stepmother, Adriana, is the cause of her mother's death. Adriana tries many times to win Reva's heart, but Reva's hatred toward her is unshakeable.

Boy and Reva make the streets their second home by spending their time riding motorcycles, which brings them closer to each other. Their motivation is the same as they both use it as an escape from their frustration regarding their respective family situations. Boy eventually finds out that Adriana, his ex-girlfriend, is Reva's stepmother. This is a shocking revelation to him.

In the end, Boy dies in a motorcycle accident.

Main cast and characters
 Stefan William as Boy Wirawan
 Natasha Wilona as Revalina Putri (Reva)
 Cut Meyriska as Adriana
 Immanuel Caesar Hito as Mondy
 Ammar Zoni as Rocky
 Ranty Maria as Cinta

Controversy

KPI issues warning
The Indonesian Broadcasting Commission (KPI) issued a warning to the producers of Anak Jalanan on 24 November 2015 for the use of explicit violence in the 11 November 2015 episode. The show also often depicts scenes of motorcycle racing. The KPI deemed this type of material to be unsuitable for broadcast due to the potential of imitative behaviour by audience members, especially as the show is mainly watched by teenagers.

Dylan Carr arrest
Dylan Carr was arrested by police on 6 January 2016 for marijuana possession while on his way to a filming location. Urine tests revealed he had been using illicit drugs.

Awards

Reboot
A reboot series, titled Anak Jalanan: A New Beginning, produced by MNC Pictures, premiered on 13 December 2021 on GTV.

References

External links
 
 Anak Jalanan on SinemArt 

2015 Indonesian television series debuts
Musical television soap operas
Indonesian comedy television series
Indonesian drama television series
Indonesian television soap operas
2010s Indonesian television series
2010s television soap operas